Pine Park is an unincorporated community in Grady County, in the U.S. state of Georgia.

History
Pine Park had its start when the Atlantic Coast Line Railway was extended to that point. The Georgia General Assembly incorporated Pine Park as a town in 1910. A post office called Pine Park was established in 1902, and remained in operation until 1954.

References

Former municipalities in Georgia (U.S. state)
Unincorporated communities in Grady County, Georgia